Jahir Ocampo Marroquín (born 12 January 1990) is a Mexican diver who won the bronze medal at the 2013 World Aquatics Championships in Barcelona in the synchronized 3 metre springboard event with his partner Rommel Pacheco.

References

1990 births
Living people
Mexican male divers
Sportspeople from the State of Mexico
Divers at the 2015 Pan American Games
Pan American Games gold medalists for Mexico
Pan American Games silver medalists for Mexico
Divers at the 2016 Summer Olympics
Olympic divers of Mexico
World Aquatics Championships medalists in diving
Pan American Games medalists in diving
Medalists at the 2015 Pan American Games
21st-century Mexican people
20th-century Mexican people